Maqên or Maqin County is a county of Qinghai Province, China. It is under the administration of Golog Tibetan Autonomous Prefecture.

Name
The county is named for Anyê Maqên, the Tibetan name for a revered local mountain.

Administrative divisions
Maqên is divided into two towns and six townships:

Dawu Town
Lajia Town
Dawu Township
Dongqinggou Township
Xueshan Township
Xiadawu Township

Youyun Township
Dangluo Township

Climate
Maqên County has an alpine subarctic climate (Köppen Dwc)

See also
 List of administrative divisions of Qinghai
  Golog Maqin Airport

References

County-level divisions of Qinghai
Golog Tibetan Autonomous Prefecture